Shepel is a gender-neutral Slavic surname. Notable people with the surname include:

Anatoliy Shepel (born 1949), Ukrainian football player
Dmitry Shepel (born 1977), Russian speed skater

Slavic-language surnames